The following is a list of notable first ascents of the summits of major mountains around the world, in chronological order. 

The list does not include the first ascent of new routes to previously climbed mountain summits.  For example, this list contains the first ascent of the summit of the Eiger in 1858, but not the more famous first ascent of the north face of the Eiger in 1938.

See also

 List of first ascents in the Alps
 List of first ascents in the Himalayas
 List of first ascents in the Sierra Nevada (U.S.)

References

Notes and further reading
German and Austrian Alpine Club, Die Erschliessung der Ostalpen Volumes 1, 2, and 3, Berlin, 1894.
Gottlieb Studer, Über Eis und Schnee: Die höchsten Gipfel der Schweiz und die Geschichte ihrer Besteigung, Volumes 1, 2, and 3, Schmid, Francke & Company, 1869-1899
Frederick L. Wolfe, High Summits: 370 Famous Peak First Ascents and Other Significant Events in Mountaineering History, Hugo House Publishers, 2013,  (for a guideline; the book contains many major errors)
Abbreviations in the reference list: AAJ: American Alpine Journal, AJ: The Alpine Journal, HJ: The_Himalayan Journal.

Lists of mountains
Climbing and mountaineering-related lists